Viktor Eduardovich Kalyuzhin (Russian: Виктор Эдуардович Калюжин; born 9 May 2001) is a Russian artistic gymnast. He‘s the silver medalist of the 2018 European Junior Championships on still rings.

Career

In 2018 he became the silver medalist at the European Junior Championships on still rings and won the Team title along with team mates Yuri Busse, Grigorii Klimentev, Mikhail Khudchenko and Sergei Naidin.

Kalyuzhin made his senior international debut at the Mersin World Cup  were he won silver on parallel bars and bronze on still rings.

Competitive history

References

Living people
2001 births
Russian male artistic gymnasts
21st-century Russian people